Vitali Sergeyevich Streltsov (born 24 February 1982) is a Russian former professional football player.

Club career
He played two seasons in the Russian Football National League for FC Dynamo Makhachkala and FC Baltika Kaliningrad.

References

External links
 

1982 births
Sportspeople from Krasnodar
Living people
Russian footballers
Association football midfielders
FC Zhemchuzhina Sochi players
FC Baltika Kaliningrad players
FC Dynamo Stavropol players
FC SKA Rostov-on-Don players
FC Dynamo Makhachkala players